Lawrence Francis Katz (born 1959) is Elisabeth Allison Professor of Economics at Harvard University and a Research Associate of the National Bureau of Economic Research.

Education and career
He graduated from the University of California at Berkeley in 1981 and earned his Ph.D. in Economics from the Massachusetts Institute of Technology in 1985.

He served as the chief economist at the U.S. Department of Labor from 1993 to 1994 under Robert Reich, Bill Clinton's then Secretary of Labor.

Katz and his fellow Harvard colleague Claudia Goldin, who is his "personal as well as research partner", wrote The Race Between Education and Technology in 2008, which argued that the United States became the world's richest nation thanks to its schools. It was praised as "a monumental achievement that supplies a unified framework for interpreting how the demand and supply of human capital have shaped the distribution of earnings in the U.S. labor market over the twentieth century", and Alan Krueger of Princeton University said that it "represent[ed] the best of what economics has to offer".

Katz has been editor of the Quarterly Journal of Economics since 1991. He also serves as the Principal Investigator for the long-term evaluation of the "Moving to Opportunity", a randomized housing mobility experiment.

He is the co-Scientific Director of J-PAL North America, past President of the Society of Labor Economists, and has been elected a fellow of the National Academy of Sciences, American Academy of Arts and Sciences, the Econometric Society, and the Society of Labor Economists. Katz serves on the Panel of Economic Advisers of the Congressional Budget Office as well as on the Boards of the Russell Sage Foundation and the Manpower Demonstration Research Corporation.

References

1959 births
20th-century American economists
21st-century American economists
Chief Economists of the United States Department of Labor
Economics journal editors
Education economists
Fellows of the American Academy of Arts and Sciences
Fellows of the Econometric Society
Labor economists
Living people
University of California, Berkeley alumni
Massachusetts Institute of Technology alumni
Harvard University faculty